Oola GAA is a Gaelic football club, founded in 1887. It is based in the village of Oola in County Limerick, Ireland. The club only plays football; hurlers in the parish play with neighbouring Doon.

Honours
 Limerick Senior Football Championship (6): 1900, 1918, 1922, 1925, 1961, 1979
 Limerick Intermediate Football Championship (1) 2015
 Limerick Junior Football Championship (1) 1969

References

External links
Official site
 Oola club notes

Gaelic games clubs in County Limerick
Gaelic football clubs in County Limerick